Austrian Nazism or Austrian National Socialism was a pan-German movement that was formed at the beginning of the 20th century. The movement took a concrete form on 15 November 1903 when the German Worker's Party (DAP) was established in Austria with its secretariat stationed in the town of Aussig (now Ústí nad Labem in the Czech Republic). It was suppressed under the rule of Engelbert Dollfuss (1932–34), with its political organization, the DNSAP ("German National Socialist Workers' Party") banned in early 1933, but was revived and made part of the German Nazi Party after the German annexation of Austria in 1938.

Origins 
Franko Stein, from the town of Eger (now Cheb, Czech Republic) and an apprentice bookbinder Ludwig Vogel, from the town of Brüx (now Most, Czech Republic), organised the Deutschnationaler Arbeiterbund (German National Workers' League) in 1893. It was a collection of labourers, apprentices, and trade unionists from the railroads, mines, and textile industries, who upheld nationalism as a result of their conflicts with the non-German-speaking portions of the workforce, especially in the railway systems. In 1899, Stein was able to convene a workers' congress in Eger and promulgated a 25-point program.

Another convention was called in April 1902, under the title of "German-Political Workers' Association for Austria", in Saaz. In Aussig, on 15 November 1903, they reorganized under the name of the "German Workers' Party in Austria". At further party congresses, Hans Knirsch proposed to call themselves the "Nationalsozialistische" (National-Socialist) or "Deutsch-Soziale" (German-social) Workers' Party. The Bohemian groups blocked the proposal, who did not want to copy the name of the Czech National Social Party. An early member of this group is Ferdinand Burschowsky, a printer from Hohenstadt (Moravia), who was active in writing and publishing.

DNSAP
At a party congress in Vienna in May 1918, the DAP changed its name to the Deutsche Nationalsozialistische Arbeiterpartei (DNSAP) and produced a National Socialist Program, which is thought to have influenced the later German Nazi manifesto. From 1920, the swastika was added as the party symbol. Before 1920, it consisted of a hammer, oak leaves and a quill.<ref>[https://arplan.org/2019/10/17/german-national-socialist-workers-party ("National Socialists Before Hitler, Part IV: The German National Socialist Workers’ Party (DNSAP)")</ref>

The Austrian DNSAP split into several factions in 1923 and again in 1926, the Deutschsozialen Verein (German-Social Association) led by Dr. Walter Riehl, the Schulz-Gruppe,aieou: http://www.aeiou.at/aeiou.encyclop.n/n122448.htm Nationalsozialismus , and other splinter groups. After 1930, most former DNSAP members became supporters of the German NSDAP led by Austrian-born Adolf Hitler and were one of the chief elements leading the pro-Nazi coup in 1938 that brought about the Anschluss of Austria with Germany.

According to fascism scholar Stanley G. Payne, if elections had been held in 1933, the DNSAP might have mustered about 25% of the votes. Contemporary Time magazine analysts suggested a higher support of 50%, with a 75% approval rate in the Tyrol region bordering Nazi Germany.

Leaders of the party, who were dubbed Landesleiter due to the recognition of Hitler as overall Führer, included Alfred Proksch (1931–33), Hermann Neubacher (1935) and Josef Leopold (1936–38), although real power frequently lay with Theodor Habicht, a German sent by Hitler to oversee Nazi activity in Austria.

See also
 Nazi Party
 Austrian SS
 Austrofascism
 Austria under Nazism
 Weimar Timeline
 German Workers' Party (Austria-Hungary)

References
Notes

Bibliography
 
 
 Rees, Philip (1990) Biographical Dictionary of the Extreme Right Since 1890. New York: Simon & Schuster. 
 Whiteside, Andrew Gladding (1962) Austrian National Socialism Before 1918. The Hague: Martinus Nijhoff.

Further reading
 Pauley, Bruce F. (1981) Hitler and the Forgotten Nazis: A History of Austrian National Socialism''. Chapel Hill, North CarolinaL  University of North Carolina Press. 
 

Nazi parties
Political history of Austria
German nationalism in Austria
German nationalist political parties
Banned far-right parties